Joseph Parecattil (1 April 1912 – 20 February 1987) was an Indian prelate of the Syro Malabar Catholic Church. He served as Archbishop of Ernakulam from 1956 to 1984, and was elevated to the cardinalate in 1969.

Biography
Joseph Parecattil was born in Kidangoor, Kerala, and studied at the minor seminary of Ernakulam and the major seminary of Kandy, from where he obtained a doctorate in theology (with a dissertation entitled: "Augustine vs. Pelagius on Grace"). Varghese Payyappilly Palakkappilly was the manager of St. Mary's High School, Alwaye where he had his boarding life. He also attended the University of Madras, where he specialised in economics. Ordained to the priesthood on 24 August 1939, he then did pastoral work in the Archdiocese of Ernakulam, serving as assistant pastor at Narakal and North Paravur and as pastor at Chunangamvely. He was also editor of the weekly Sathyadeepam ("Light of Truth").

On 28 October 1953, Parecattil was appointed Auxiliary Bishop of Ernakulam and Titular Bishop of Arethusa dei Siri by Pope Pius XII. He received his episcopal consecration on the following 30 November from Cardinal Eugène Tisserant, with Archbishop Joseph Attipetty and Bishop George Alapatt serving as co-consecrators. After the death of Archbishop Augustine Kandathil on 10 January 1956, Parecattil was promoted to Archbishop of Ernakulam on the following 20 July. He attended the Second Vatican Council from 1962 to 1965, and served as President of the Syro-Malabar Episcopal conference, of the Kerala Catholic Episcopal Conference, and of the Catholic Bishops' Conference of India (1972–1976).

Pope Paul VI created him Cardinal Priest of Nostra Signora "Regina Pacis" in the consistory of 30 April 1969. In addition to his duties as archbishop, Parecattil was also President of the Pontifical Commission for the Revision of the Code of Oriental Canon Law from 1972 to 1987. He was one of the cardinal electors who participated in the conclaves of August and October 1978, which elected Popes John Paul I and John Paul II respectively. After an 18-year-long tenure, Holy see ordered him to submit his resignation and he resigned as archbishop on 30 January 1984.

Parecattil died in Kochi, aged 74. He is buried in St. Mary's Cathedral Basilica in Ernakulam.

See also

References

1912 births
1987 deaths
Participants in the Second Vatican Council
20th-century Eastern Catholic bishops
Indian cardinals
Syro-Malabar Catholic Archbishops of Ernakulam-Angamaly
Cardinals created by Pope Paul VI
People from Ernakulam district
University of Madras alumni